KYKC 100.1 FM is a radio station licensed to Byng, Oklahoma.  The station broadcasts a country music format and is owned by The Chickasaw Nation.

References

External links
KYKC's official website

YKC
Country radio stations in the United States